Feelin' Groovy is the debut album by the American sunshine pop band Harpers Bizarre, released in 1967.

Background
Two Ted Templeman/Dick Scoppettone originals from 1966 were added as bonus cuts to the 2001 Sundazed CD reissue of this title:  "Bye, Bye, Bye" and "Lost My Love Today."  The latter tune was the "B" side to the single of "The 59th Street Bridge Song (Feelin' Groovy)," Harpers Bizarre's most enduring hit.  This recording was also available as an import.  It can be found under Warner Brothers label manufactured by His Master's voice (N.Z.) LTD.

Track listing
"Come to the Sunshine" (Van Dyke Parks)
"Happy Talk" (Richard Rodgers, Oscar Hammerstein II)
"Come Love" (Alan Bergman, Marilyn Keith, Larry Markes)
"Raspberry Rug" (Leon Russell, Donna Washburn)
"The 59th Street Bridge Song (Feelin' Groovy)" (Paul Simon)
"The Debutante's Ball" (Randy Newman)
"Happy Land" (Randy Newman)
"Peter and the Wolf" (Ron Elliott, Sergei Prokofiev, Robert Durand)
"I Can Hear the Darkness" (Leon Russell, Donna Washburn)
"Simon Smith and the Amazing Dancing Bear" (Randy Newman)

References

1967 debut albums
Harpers Bizarre albums
Warner Records albums
Albums produced by Lenny Waronker